Warszawa Wschodnia, in English Warsaw East, is one of the most important railway stations in Warsaw, Poland. Its more official name is Warszawa Wschodnia Osobowa (translated as Warsaw East Passenger). It is located on the eastern side of the Vistula river, on the border of the Praga-Północ and Praga-Południe districts, on the Warsaw Cross-City Line. It serves all trains passing through the larger Warszawa Centralna and Śródmieście stations which stop or terminate at Wschodnia station. It is one of the busiest railway stations in Poland, with over 800 daily trains.

History 
The station first started operating in 1866 as the terminus of the newly built Warsaw–Terespol Railway. By 1933 the station was rebuilt as a through the station with the opening of the Cross-City line. The station building was destroyed during World War II, and in postwar decades provisional, temporary buildings were used to serve passengers.

The current station building opened in 1969 and was for a while the most modern large station in Warsaw. In the following years, it received little investment and so fell into disrepair. At the beginning of the 21st century, it was considered the worst railway station in Poland, according to Gazeta Wyborcza which gave it last place in the ranking of 23 most significant Polish railway stations.

The station building was renovated for the UEFA Euro 2012 championship.

As of May 2021, its sister station Warsaw Zachodnia station appears to be under significant reconstruction.

Train services
The station is served by the following service(s):

EuroCity services (EC) (EC 95 by DB) (EIC by PKP) Berlin - Frankfurt (Oder) - Rzepin - Poznań - Kutno - Warsaw
Express Intercity Premium services (EIP) Gdynia - Warsaw
Express Intercity Premium services (EIP) Warsaw - Wrocław
Express Intercity Premium services (EIP) Warsaw - Katowice - Bielsko-Biała
Express Intercity Premium services (EIP) Gdynia - Warsaw - Katowice - Gliwice/Bielsko-Biała
Express Intercity Premium services (EIP) Warsaw - Kraków
Express Intercity Premium services (EIP) Gdynia/Kołobrzeg - Warsaw - Kraków (- Rzeszów)
Express Intercity services (EIC) Szczecin — Warsaw 
Express Intercity services (EIC) Warsaw - Wrocław 
Express Intercity services (EIC) Warsaw - Kraków - Zakopane 
Intercity services (IC) Wrocław- Opole - Częstochowa - Warszawa
 Intercity services (IC) Wrocław - Ostrów Wielkopolski - Łódź - Warszawa
 Intercity services (IC) Zgorzelec - Legnica - Wrocław - Ostrów Wielkopolski - Łódź - Warszawa
Intercity services (IC) Białystok - Warszawa - Częstochowa - Opole - Wrocław
Intercity services (IC) Białystok - Warszawa - Łódź - Ostrów Wielkopolski - Wrocław
Intercity services (IC) Ełk - Białystok - Warszawa - Łódź - Ostrów Wielkopolski - Wrocław
Intercity services (IC) Warszawa - Częstochowa - Katowice - Bielsko-Biała
Intercity services (IC) Białystok - Warszawa - Częstochowa - Katowice - Bielsko-Biała
 Intercity services (IC) Łódź Fabryczna — Warszawa Wschodnia
 Intercity services (IC) Łódź Fabryczna — Warszawa — Lublin Główny
Intercity services (IC) Olsztyn - Warszawa - Skierniewice - ŁódźIntercity services (IC) Olsztyn - Warszawa - Skierniewice - Częstochowa - Katowice - Bielsko-BiałaIntercity services (IC) Olsztyn - Warszawa - Skierniewice - Częstochowa - Katowice - Gliwice - RacibórzIntercity services (TLK) Warszawa - Częstochowa - Lubliniec - Opole - Wrocław - Szklarska Poręba GórnaIntercity services (TLK) Warszawa - Częstochowa - Katowice - Opole - Wrocław - Szklarska Poręba GórnaIntercity services (TLK) Gdynia Główna — Zakopane Koleo. PKP TLK 53104 MAŁOPOLSKA Gdynia Główna — Zakopane. Timetable. https://koleo.pl/en/pociag/TLK/53104-MA%C5%81OPOLSKA
Intercity services (TLK) Kołobrzeg — Gdynia Główna — Warszawa Wschodnia — Kraków GłównyRegional services (ŁKA) Łódz - Warsaw''

Gallery

See also
Rail transport in Poland
List of busiest railway stations in Poland

References

External links 

Railway stations in Poland opened in 1866
Wschodnia Osobowa
Railway stations served by Koleje Mazowieckie
Railway stations served by Szybka Kolej Miejska (Warsaw)
Railway stations served by Przewozy Regionalne InterRegio
1866 establishments in the Russian Empire